Ayr railway station serves the town of Ayr in South Ayrshire, Scotland. It is situated in Smith Street, off Burns Statue Square.

History 
The station was opened on 12 January 1886 by the Glasgow and South Western Railway. This was the third station to be named 'Ayr' in the town: the original station, located on the former Glasgow, Paisley, Kilmarnock and Ayr Railway, opened in 1839. When the Ayr and Dalmellington Railway was opened in 1856, a station called Ayr Townhead was opened on the south side of the town. When the original Ayr station was closed on 1 July 1857, Townhead station was renamed 'Ayr', however this second station closed the same day the current station opened.
The Glasgow and South Western Railway  became part of the London Midland and Scottish Railway during the Grouping of 1923, passing on to the Scottish Region of British Railways during the nationalisation of 1948.

When sectorisation was introduced in the 1980s, the station was served by ScotRail until the privatisation of British Rail.

Station description 

Ayr station consists of two through platforms, and two bay platforms to the north. The northbound platform station building is located on the ground floor of the four-storey hotel attached to the station, and the southbound platform has a large single storey sandstone building. The glazed canopy that covers a small section of all four platforms and the waiting area was originally much larger than its current size.

In December 2006, the station received automatic ticket barriers as part of ScotRail's revenue protection policy.

Hotel 

The hotel attached to the station was originally opened by the Glasgow and South Western Railway in June 1866; and it became part of the British Transport Hotels (BTH) at nationalisation. Future President Woodrow Wilson stayed in the hotel during his cycling trip in Britain in 1899. It was sold by BTH in October 1951 and has changed ownership a number of times, having been owned by Stakis Hotels, Quality, and Swallow Hotels. Together with the railway station building, it is a category B listed building.

The Station Hotel is currently derelict and is on the Buildings at Risk register for Scotland. Its poor condition had necessitated an exclusion zone that covered a portion of the station platforms and tracks.

Services

Past 

Ayr used to have an Intercity twice-daily London Euston service (one daytime and one sleeping car train) which ran to/from Stranraer via Barassie to the Glasgow South Western Line, which ceased in the early 1990s. In the 1980s the Royal Scot started from Ayr. Following completion of the electrification of the Ayrshire Coast Line the train operated in push-pull mode with Class 87 or Class 90. In the early 1990s with the restructuring of British Rail the train ceased to start from Ayr.
 
The Ayr to Glasgow service is one of the busiest on the rail network in Scotland and can suffer from serious overcrowding at peak times. To alleviate this, in June 2005 ScotRail extended the length of trains departing Ayr between 0643 and 1813 on weekdays to six cars wherever possible. Between 2002 and 2011 the Glasgow - Ayr route were served by Class 334s and 1986-2011 Class 318s.

May 2011 
There are trains from Ayr to Glasgow Central every half hour daily, except for Sundays during the winter timetable (October–May), when the frequency is hourly. From May 2011, most services on Ayrshire and Inverclyde lines were operated by Class 380s. By the end of June 2011 Class 318 and 334 had been largely replaced, however on rare occasions they were still being used.

There is a limited service to Stranraer on Sundays (three trains only).

December 2012 
There are three trains per hour from Ayr to Glasgow Central during weekdays consisting of two limited stop services and one all stations service. On Sundays there is a half-hourly service to Glasgow.

On Sundays there are three trains to Stranraer. As of early 2014, there are four daily services to Edinburgh Waverley direct, via Carstairs.

December 2019 
On Monday to Saturday, at off peak periods, there are four trains per hour to Glasgow (two fast and two stopping).

There are five trains per day to Edinburgh via Glasgow and Motherwell.

There is a regular hourly service to Girvan, there are ten trains to Kilmarnock, running a two hourly frequency (with extras during the morning and evening).

There are eight services to Stranraer, running every two hours (with a four-hour gap in the evening).

On Sunday, there is a half-hourly service to Glasgow, there are five trains to Girvan and Stranraer but there is no service to Kilmarnock.

December 2020
On Monday to Saturday, at off peak periods, there are two trains per hour to Glasgow Central. During peak, three trains per hour will run to Glasgow Central and during evenings one train per hour will run. The direct service to Edinburgh no longer runs

There is an irregular hourly/2 hourly service to Girvan with 4 of these trains extending to Stranraer.

There are six trains to Kilmarnock, also running irregularly at a frequency of 1 an hour to every 4 hours

Sunday services remain the same.

August to November 2018 amended timetable

All services from Ayr to Girvan/Stranraer were operated by replacement buses due to the exclusion zone that was place around the hotel. 
On Monday to Saturday there was a two-hourly service from Ayr to Kilmarnock operated by Class 156 DMUs. 
Ayr to Glasgow Central services ran at reduced capacity. Trains could not be longer than four carriages.

On 1 November 2018, ScotRail reinstated the service from Ayr to Stranraer. The first service to run was the 16:59 service from Stranraer to Glasgow. It was the first train to run south of Ayr for two months.

Ferry connections
Stena Line passengers travelling on through "Rail & Sail" tickets to Belfast are provided with a free coach service direct from Ayr station to Cairnryan. This departs from outside the main entrance.

References

Notes

Sources

External links

 Station on navigable O.S. map

Railway stations in Ayr
Former Glasgow and South Western Railway stations
Railway stations in Great Britain opened in 1886
Railway stations served by ScotRail
SPT railway stations
Listed railway stations in Scotland
Category B listed buildings in South Ayrshire